The Sixth Development Cabinet was the Indonesian Cabinet which served under President Suharto and Vice President Try Sutrisno from March 1993 until March 1998. The Cabinet was formed after Suharto was elected to a 6th term as President by the People's Consultative Assembly (MPR).

The five cabinet aims
Whilst announcing the Cabinet, Suharto also announced its aims.

Continuing, intensifying, deepening, and expanding National Development as an application of Pancasila with the Development Trilogy as its foundation and having national knowledge to strengthen national resilience and determination for self-reliance.
Intensifying national discipline with a State Apparatus as its pioneers and aiming towards a clean and legitimate Government in giving service to the People of Indonesia.
Institutionalizing a National Leadership Mechanism based on the 1945 Constitution, Pancasila, Pancasila Democracy, and the Pancasila Indoctrination and Application Guidelines (P4) in daily life as a state, nation, and community.
Executing a free and active foreign policy, based on the principle of peaceful coexistence in bilateral, regional, and global relationships for the sake of National Development.
Holding direct, universal, free, and secret legislative elections in 1997.

Cabinet composition
The composition of the cabinet was as follows:

President and vice-president
President: Gen. (ret.) Suharto
Vice President: Gen. (ret.) Try Sutrisno

Coordinating ministers
Coordinating Minister of Economics and Development Supervision: Saleh Afiff
Coordinating Minister of People's Welfare: Lt. Gen. (hon.) Azwar Anas
Coordinating Minister of Politics and Security: Gen. (hon.) Susilo Sudarman
Coordinating Minister of Production and Distribution: Hartarto

Departmental ministers
Minister of Home Affairs: Lt. Gen. (ret.) Yogie Suardi Memet
Minister of Foreign Affairs: Ali Alatas
Minister of Defense and Security/Commander of the Armed Forces: Gen. Edi Sudrajat
Minister of Justice: Utoyo Usman
Minister of Information: Harmoko
Minister of Finance: Mar'ie Muhammad
Minister of Trade: Satrio Budihardjo Joedono
Minister of Industry: Tungky Ariwibowo
Minister of Agriculture: Syarifuddin Baharsjah
Minister of Mines and Energy: Lt. Gen. (ret.) Ida Bagus Sudjana
Minister of Forestry: Jamaluddin Suryohadikusumo
Minister of Public Works: Radinal Mochtar
Minister of Transportation: Haryanto Danutirto
Minister of Tourism, Post, and Telecommunications: Joop Ave
Minister of Manpower: Abdul Latief
Minister of Cooperatives and Small Business: Subiakto Tjakrawerdaya
Minister of Transmigration and Forest Settlement: Siswono Yudohusodo
Minister of Education and Culture: Wardiman Joyonegoro
Minister of Health: Sujudi
Minister of Religious Affairs: Tarmizi Taher
Minister of Social Affairs: Inten Suweno

State ministers
State Minister/State Secretary: Maj. Gen. (ret.) Murdiono
State Minister/Cabinet Secretary: Saadilah Mursyid
State Minister of National Development Planning/Chairman of the National Development Planning Body (BAPPENAS): Ginandjar Kartasasmita
State Minister of Research and Technology/Chairman of the Research and Implementation of Technology Board (BPPT): B. J. Habibie
State Minister of Foodstuffs/Chairman of the Logistical Affairs Board (BULOG): Ibrahim Hasan
State Minister of Population/Chairman of Planned Families National Coordinating Body (BKKBN): Haryono Suyono
State Minister of the Promotion of Investment/Chairman of the Investment Coordinating Body: Sanyoto Sastrowardoyo
State Minister of Agrarian Affairs/Chairman of the National Land Body: Soni Harsono
State Minister of Housing: Akbar Tanjung
State Minister of Environment: Sarwono Kusumaatmaja
State Minister of Female Empowerment: Mien Sugandhi
State Minister of Youth Affairs and Sports: Hayono Isman
State Minister of Administrative Reform: Maj. Gen. (ret.) T. B. Silahahi

Officials with ministerial rank
Governor of the Central Bank: J. Soedradjad Djiwandono
Attorney General: Singgih

Changes
18 May 1993: Edi Sudrajat was replaced by General Feisal Tanjung as Commander of ABRI.
6 December 1995: The Department of Industry and Department of Trade were merged into the Department of Industry and Trade. Tungky Ariwibowo became Minister of Industry and Trade, while  Satrio Budihardjo Joedono, who had become known as "Mr Clean",  the  resumed his teaching duties at the University of Indonesia.
11 June 1997: Harmoko was replaced by Gen. (ret.) Hartono as Minister of Information. Harmoko was then appointed as State Minister of Special Affairs. This post was abolished when Harmoko was appointed chairman of the People's Consultative Assembly in October.
11 December 1997: Coordinating Minister of Politics and Security Susilo Sudarman died. 
February 1998: Soedradjad Djiwandono was replaced by Syahril Sabirin as Governor of the Central Bank 
February 1998: Feisal Tanjung was replaced by General Wiranto as Commander of ABRI.

Notes

References

 
 
 

New Order (Indonesia)
Cabinets of Indonesia
1993 establishments in Indonesia
1998 disestablishments in Indonesia
Cabinets established in 1993
Cabinets disestablished in 1998
Suharto